In December 2019, the city-state of Berlin had a population of 3,769,495 registered inhabitants in an area of . The city's population density was 4,227 inhabitants per km2. Berlin is Germany's largest city and the most populous city proper in the European Union.

In December 2015, there were 621,075 registered residents of foreign nationality, originating from approximately 190 different countries.

History

The city responded to the 1685 revocation of the Edict of Nantes in France with the Edict of Potsdam, which guaranteed religious freedom and tax-free status to French Huguenot refugees for ten years. Thanks to its role as the capital of rising Prussia, the population grew steadily: it surpassed the 100,000 mark in 1747 and the one-million mark in 1877.

Growth accelerated in the 19th century with the industrialisation after the Napoleonic Wars and the Prussian Reforms. Only about 40% of Berliners in the last quarter of the 19th century were natives of the city. Nevertheless, Berlin's population remained ethnically and even regionally very homogeneous: In 1895, over 98% of inhabitants spoke German as their native language. Among the rest were 12,000 Polish speakers, 700 Russophones and about 2,000 other Slavs. In 1900, most of the 1.9 million Berliners originated from the eastern provinces of Prussia. A fifth hailed from the surrounding province of Brandenburg, 9% from the provinces of West and East Prussia, 7% from Silesia, 6% from Pomerania, 5% from Posen, 4% from Saxony. Only about 3 to 4% had come to the city from other German regions and only about 1,5% from abroad, mostly from Austria-Hungary and the Russian Empire.

Between 1913 and 1917, the population fell by about 16% down to 1.744 million people, mostly due to men serving in World War I, but recovered somewhat after the armistice, reaching 1.928 million people in December 1919. In December 1917, during the latter part of the war, there were 58,152 military personnel and 4,017 prisoners-of-war in the city.

The industrialisation had brought about a rapid expansion of the suburbs, many of them developed explicitly for workers of specific factories, e.g. Siemensstadt and Borsigwalde. The Greater Berlin Act of 1920 (Groß-Berlin-Gesetz) boosted the population by incorporating many hitherto autonomous towns and cities, e.g. Spandau and Köpenick at the margins of the modern metropolis, but also Charlottenburg, nowadays almost in the heart of the city. This expansion made Berlin the most populous city proper of Continental Europe in the interwar period (though not the largest agglomeration) and the third-largest in the world behind London and New York.

The four-million mark was surpassed in the 1920s, and in 1942, the officially registered population reached its maximum of 4.48 million, although because of the war conditions, this was an overestimation. More likely estimates based on food rationing data show lower numbers of 3.95 million people in February 1942 and only 3.11 million people in February 1944 (incl. 177,000 foreigners) when aerial attacks approached its most intense phase.

In the context of the more general huge population movements in immediately post-war Germany, a significant part of Berlin's pre-war population permanently resettled to other parts of Germany or abroad. A 1946 census counted 436,600 Berliners in the western occupation zones and 306,823 in the Soviet zone. In 1950, this number had risen to 518,218 in what had now become the Federal Republic. Since the end of World War II, the city population has been fluctuating between 3 and 3.5 million, with a low of less than 3.1 million from the mid-1970s to mid-1980s. Between 1950 and 1961, so between the establishment of the Soviet-backed German Democratic Republic and the construction of the Berlin Wall, most of the losses were incurred by East Berlin, while West Berlin showed modest growth of 2.3%.

Moving to West Berlin was attractive for those from West Germany who wished to avoid the draft from 1957 to 1990, because the special administrative status of the city meant that the draft could not be enforced there.

Asylum policies in West Berlin triggered waves of immigration during the 1960s and 1970s. Berlin is home to about 250,000 Turks (especially in Kreuzberg, Neukölln and Wedding, a locality in the borough of Mitte), the largest Turkish community outside Turkey.

During the 1990s, the Aussiedlergesetze enabled immigration to Germany of residents of the former Soviet Union. Ethnic Germans from countries from the former Soviet Union make up the largest portion of the Russian-speaking community. Immigration continues from a number of Western countries, particularly by young people from Germany and other parts of Europe.

Statistics

City size

Municipality

Berlin in 2009 was estimated to have another 100,000 to 250,000 non-registered inhabitants. The city's population density was 4,048 inhabitants per km2. Berlin is the most populous city proper in the EU.

Urban area

Metropolitan area

Population
In 2014, the city state Berlin had 37,368 live births (+6.6%), a record number since 1991. The number of deaths was 32,314. Almost 2 million households were counted in the city. 54 percent of them were single-person households. More than 337,000 families with children under the age of 18 lived in Berlin. In 2014 the German capital registered a migration surplus of approximately 40,000 people.

Boroughs

Nationalities 

As of December 2013 there were approximately 1,000,000 people (about 30 percent of the population) with an immigrant background living in Berlin, with significant differences in their distribution. The immigrant community is diverse, with Middle Easterners (including Turkish and Kurdish people and Arabs), smaller numbers of East Asians, Sub-Saharan Africans and other European immigrants, Eastern Europeans forming the largest groups. Since the accession of Romania and Bulgaria to the European Union there has been a Romani influx. About 70,000 Afro-Germans live in Berlin.

There are more than 25 non-indigenous communities with a population of at least 10,000 people, including Turkish, Kurdish,Polish, Russian, Croatian, Palestinian, Serbian, Italian, Bosnian, Vietnamese, American, Romanian, Bulgarian, Chinese, Austrian, Ghanaian, Ukrainian, French, British, Spanish, Israeli, Thai, Iranian, Egyptian and Syrian communities.

Employment

In 2015, the total labour force in Berlin was 1.85 million. The unemployment rate reached a 24-year low in November 2015 and stood at 10.0% . From 2012 to 2015 Berlin, as a German state, had the highest annual employment growth rate. Around 130,000 jobs were added in this period.

Languages

German
German is the official and predominant spoken language in Berlin. It is a West Germanic language that derives most of its vocabulary from the Germanic branch of the Indo-European language family. German is one of 24 languages of the European Union, and one of the three working languages of the European Commission.

Berlin dialect

Berlinerisch or Berlinisch is a variety of High German. It is spoken in Berlin and the surrounding metropolitan area. It originates from a Mark Brandenburgish variant.  The dialect is now seen more as a sociolect, largely through increased immigration and trends among the educated population to speak standard German in everyday life.

International languages
The most commonly spoken foreign languages in Berlin are English, Turkish, Russian, Arabic, Polish, Kurdish, Vietnamese, Serbian, Croatian, Greek, and other Asian languages.

Turkish, Arabic, Kurdish, Serbian and Croatian are heard more often in the western part, due to the large Middle Eastern and former-Yugoslavian communities; Vietnamese, Russian and Polish have more native speakers in eastern Berlin. English, Vietnamese, Russian, and Polish have more native speakers in eastern Berlin.

Religions

More than 60% of Berlin residents have no registered religious affiliation. The largest denomination in 2010 was the Protestant regional church body – the Evangelical Church of Berlin-Brandenburg-Silesian Upper Lusatia (EKBO) – a United church. EKBO is a member of the Evangelical Church in Germany (EKD) and Union Evangelischer Kirchen (UEK), and accounts for 18.7% of the local population. The Roman Catholic Church has 9.1% of residents registered as its members. About 2.7% of the population identify with other Christian denominations (mostly Eastern Orthodox, but also various Protestants).

An estimated 300,000–420,000 Muslims reside in Berlin, making up about 8–11 percent of the population. 0.9% of Berliners belong to religions other than Christianity or Islam. Of the estimated population of 30,000–45,000 Jewish residents, approximately 12,000 are registered members of religious organizations.

See also

List of metropolitan areas by population
Largest urban areas of the European Union
List of people from Berlin

References

External links
 Berlin-Brandenburg Statistical Office (Amt für Statistik Berlin-Brandenburg)
 Schwenk, Herbert, Berliner Stadtentwicklung von A bis Z: Kleines Handbuch zum Werden und Wachsen der deutschen Hauptstadt, 2nd edition. Berlin: Luisenstädtischer Bildungsverein, 1998.

Geography of Berlin
History of Berlin
Berlin
Berlin